Old money is "the inherited wealth of established upper-class families (i.e. gentry, patriciate)" or "a person, family, or lineage possessing inherited wealth."

It can also refer to the pre-decimal coinage of the British Empire.

Old Money may also refer to:

Film and TV
"Old Money" (The Simpsons), a second season episode of The Simpsons
"Old Money" (El Tigre), an episode of the Nickelodeon animated television series El Tigre
 Old Money (play), a play by Wendy Wasserstein
 Altes Geld, an Austrian TV series whose title translates as "Old Money"

Music
Old Money (album), a 2008 record by guitarist Omar Rodríguez-López of The Mars Volta
"Old Money", song from above album by guitarist Omar Rodríguez-López
"Old Money" (Lana Del Rey song) from the 2014 album Ultraviolence
"Old Money", a song by rapper Playboi Carti from the 2018 album Die Lit

See also 
 New money (nouveau riche)